Teng Yin (died 8 November 256), courtesy name Chengsi, was a military general of the state of Eastern Wu during the Three Kingdoms period of China. Teng Yin plotted the assassination of regent Sun Chen. However, Sun Chen discovered the plot, accused him of treason and had him executed.

See also
 Lists of people of the Three Kingdoms

Notes

References

 Chen, Shou (3rd century). Records of the Three Kingdoms (Sanguozhi).
 Pei, Songzhi (5th century). Annotations to Records of the Three Kingdoms (Sanguozhi zhu).

Year of birth unknown
256 deaths
Eastern Wu politicians
Political office-holders in Anhui
Political office-holders in Zhejiang
Political office-holders in Jiangsu
Executed Eastern Wu people
People executed by Eastern Wu
3rd-century executions